Rachana jalindra, the banded royal, is a lycaenid or blue butterfly found in the Indomalayan realm. The species was first described by Thomas Horsfield in 1829.

Subspecies
Rachana jalindra jalindra (Java)
Rachana jalindra indra (Moore, [1884]) (Nepal, Sikkim to Thailand and Myanmar)
Rachana jalindra macanita (Fruhstorfer, 1912) (southern India)
Rachana jalindra burbona (Hewitson, 1878) (Sumatra, Peninsular Malaya)
Rachana jalindra mingawa (Fruhstorfer, 1914) (south-western Borneo)
Rachana jalindra gamtara (Fruhstorfer, 1912) (northern Borneo)
Rachana jalindra degenerata (Fruhstorfer, 1897) (Nias)
Rachana jalindra palawandra (Staudinger, 1889) (Palawan)
Rachana jalindra tarpina (Hewitson, 1878) (Andamans)
Rachana jalindra maganda Takanami, 1982
Rachana jalindra shiraishii Takanami, 1984 (Philippines)
Rachana jalindra mindorensis (Schröder & Treadaway, 1985)
Rachana jalindra balabacensis (Schröder & Treadaway, 1986)
Rachana jalindra obsoleta (Schröder & Treadaway, 1993)

References

External links
 With images.

Iolaini
Fauna of Pakistan
Butterflies of Asia
Butterflies of Singapore
Butterflies of Borneo